Jingle-jangle fallacies are erroneous assumptions that either two different things are the same because they bear the same name (jingle fallacy); or two identical or almost identical things are different because they are labeled differently (jangle fallacy). In research, a jangle fallacy is the inference that two measures (e.g., tests, scales) with different names measure different constructs. By comparison, a jingle fallacy is the assumption that two measures which are called by the same name capture the same construct.

An example of the jangle fallacy can be found in tests designed to assess emotional intelligence. Some of these tests measure merely personality or regular IQ-tests. An example of the jingle fallacy is that personality and values are sometimes conflated and treated as the same construct. Jingle and jangle fallacies make it challenging to review literatures for meta-analysis.  Machine learning tools have been created to discover relevant papers even when the same construct is named differently in different articles.

See also
Construct validity

References

Further reading

Informal fallacies